KULE may refer to:

 KULE (AM), a radio station (730 AM) licensed to serve Ephrata, Washington, United States
 KZUS, a radio station (92.3 FM) licensed to serve Ephrata, Washington, which held the call sign KULE-FM from 1990 to 2013
 KTRB, a radio station (860 AM) licensed to serve San Francisco, California, United States, which formerly held the call sign KULE